The Cape Cod Modern House Trust is a non-profit historic preservation organization working to preserve and interpret Modern period houses built on Cape Cod in the U.S. state of Massachusetts. The organization describes its mission to ''promote the documentation and preservation of significant examples of Modernist architecture on the Outer Cape."

Founded by Peter McMahon in 2007, the trust has worked with the National Park Service on cataloging and documenting, stabilizing, or restoring modernist Cape Cod homes by the architects Marcel Breuer, Serge Chermayeff, Jack Hall, Olav Hammarston, Oliver Morton, and Charles Zehnder. 

The trust is currently working on a three-year project restoring the Kugel-Gips House, designed in 1970 by Charles Zehnder and located within the National Park Service's Cape Cod National Seashore. The Kugel-Gips House and other modernist houses lying within the Cape Cod National Seashore are listed on the National Register of Historic Places.

References

External links
 Website of the Cape Cod Modern House Trust
Photostream of modern houses on Cape Cod
 Wellfleet, Massachusetts Community Preservation Committee

Modernist architecture in Massachusetts
History of New England
Non-profit organizations based in Massachusetts
Heritage organizations
Massachusetts culture
Historic preservation organizations in the United States
Organizations established in 2007
2007 establishments in Massachusetts